ONE Friday Fights: Nong-O vs. Ramazanov (also known as ONE Lumpinee 1) was a combat sport event produced by ONE Championship that took place on January 20, 2023, at Lumpinee Boxing Stadium in Bangkok, Thailand.

Background 
The event marked the promotion's first venue in Lumpinee Boxing Stadium which is a standard Muay Thai stadium in Thailand. In this the ONE Lumpinee event will be broadcast live on Channel 7 HD in Friday at 20:30PM (UTC+07:00).

A ONE Bantamweight Muay Thai World Championship bout between current champion Nong-O Gaiyanghadao and former ONE Bantamweight Kickboxing Champion Alaverdi Ramazanov was originally to take place at ONE on Prime Video 6 but the bout announced moved to headline this event. The pairing was previously scheduled at ONE: X, but Ramazanov pull out from the card due to the 2022 Russian invasion of Ukraine, all Russian athletes were removed from the card as a result of the Singaporean government banning them from entering the country.

At the weigh-ins, Saensiri Petch Por.Tor.Or, Mavlud Tupiev and Keivan Soleimani all failed hydration test and were forced to take catchweights. Saensiri weighed in at 151 pounds, 6 pounds over the limit, Tupiev came in at 147 pounds, 2 pounds over the bantamweight limit, Soleimani weighed in at 177 pounds, 7 pounds over the lightweight limit. Both bouts proceeded at catchweight. Saensiri, Tupiev and Soleimani was fined their purse, which went to their opponent Khomarwut F.A.Group, Muangthai P.K.Saenchai and Josh Hill.

Results

Bonus awards 
The following fighters were awarded bonuses.
Performance of the Night ($50,000): Nong-O Gaiyanghadao and  Saeksan Or. Kwanmuang
Performance of the Night ($10,000): Sakaengam Jitmuangnon and Muangthai P.K.Saenchai

See also 

 2023 in ONE Championship
 List of ONE Championship events
 List of current ONE fighters

References 

Events in Bangkok
ONE Championship events
2023 in mixed martial arts
Mixed martial arts in Thailand
Sports competitions in Thailand
January 2023 sports events in Thailand